Melica secunda, is a species of grass that can be found in China (Gansu, Sichuan, Xinjiang, Xizang), Afghanistan, and Kashmir.

Description
The species is perennial and tufted, with creeping rhizomes. It glumes are broadly elliptic, subacute, and are hyline on the margins and at the tip. Lemma is also obtuse or subacute, 7-nerved, hairless and scaberulous.

Ecology
The flowers bloom from May to August.

References

Further reading

secunda
Flora of Asia